Palyeshgah Metro Station is a station in Tehran Metro Line 1. It is located near Tehran Refinary, a town near Shahr-e-Rey on the southern outskirts of Tehran. It is Between Shahed - Bagher Shahr Metro Station and Shahr-e-Rey Metro Station. 

The station was formerly called Bagher Shahr, but the name was changed, along with the name of Shahed - Bagher Shahr Metro Station, formerly known simply as Shahed on 26 August 2017.

References

Tehran Metro stations
Railway stations opened in 2005